The Clarence T. C. Ching Athletics Complex, located on the campus of the University of Hawaiʻi at Mānoa in Honolulu, features a three-story building next to an all-purpose track and Clarence T. C. Ching Field. The facility, built in 2015, includes locker rooms and a meeting room for Hawaii beach volleyball, cross country, women's soccer and track and field teams.

The university's football team also utilizes the facility for practices, and it became the team’s temporary stadium starting in 2021. The stadium has a seating capacity of 9,300, which will expand to 17,000 in 2023.

History
The complex replaced the university's former sports facility, Cooke Field, following a $5 million donation from the foundation established by Hawaii real estate developer Clarence T.C. Ching (1912–1985). This was a record donation for the university's athletics program. This donation was intended to cover half the estimated $10 million cost of the development, due to open in 2013. However, project delays mean the complex ran 60% over budget and did not open until 2015. The remainder of the budget was covered by the university and the state of Hawaii.

The delay led to threats from the National Collegiate Athletic Association (NCAA) to decertify the institution's athletic department, given the lack of women's sports facilities. A key aspect of the new complex was to better serve women's athletics at Manoa, in particular the women's soccer team which previously played on a non-NCAA-compliant field.

Uses
The athletics complex serves as the home field for the university's women's soccer team. It also has a 778-seat beach volleyball venue with two competition courts, used by the university's beach volleyball team.  The venue also serves as a cross country course. The field and its surrounding track function as the outdoor track and field facility for the university.

College football
The complex normally serves as the practice facility for the university's football team. In December 2020, issues with Aloha Stadium (home venue of the football team since 1975) led to that venue halting the scheduling of new events. As a result, the team announced plans to play home games on campus at the athletics complex "for at least the next three years". Prior to the 2021 season, the university prepared the complex for home football games, including increasing seating capacity, replace the existing turf, installing a new scoreboard and speaker system and upgrading the press box.

The NCAA requires football programs to "average at least 15,000 in actual or paid attendance for all home football contests over a two-year rolling period" to remain at the Football Bowl Subdivision (FBS) level. The initial expansion included 9,000 seats for the 2021 season, with plans to expand to 15,000 for the 2022 season, which will reach the FBS minimum. The expansion to 15,000 was delayed until 2023 due to effects stemming from the COVID-19 pandemic, which forced Hawaii football to play behind closed doors or with a limited capacity for the first half of their 2021 home schedule.

Matlin formally announced a plan to expand to 17,000 for the 2023 season. It was presented to the University of Hawaii Board of Regents on August 17, 2022, and was unanimously approved a day later.

See also
List of NCAA Division I FBS football stadiums
Les Murakami Stadium, located to the southeast of the complex
Stan Sheriff Center, located to the west of the complex

References

American football venues in Hawaii
Athletics (track and field) venues in Hawaii
College beach volleyball venues in the United States
College cross country courses in the United States
College track and field venues in the United States
Cross country running courses in the United States
Hawaii Rainbow Warriors and Rainbow Wahine
Hawaiʻi Rainbow Wāhine beach volleyball venues
Hawaii Rainbow Warriors football
Hawaii Rainbow Warriors and Rainbow Wahine track and field
Volleyball venues in Hawaii
Sports venues completed in 2015
2015 establishments in Hawaii